icflix is a Middle Eastern streaming and VoD platform that provides Jazwood (Arabic content), Bollywood and Hollywood movies and TV series. Icflix content is available in three languages: Arabic, English and French. 

Icflix streaming service can be used worldwide, but the company's main markets are the following countries: Morocco, Egypt, Kuwait, United Arab Emirates, Tunisia, Kingdom of Saudi Arabia, and Pakistan.

During 2014, Icflix announced the launching of the App "icflix kids" on Samsung devices through the partnership that both companies have signed.

In February 2015, the company launched the payment by text message for its Moroccan subscribers and by credit card for its Tunisian viewers. It was announced by the company during the same month that subscriptions had reached 250,000 in the MENA region.

In March 2015, Icflix announced its collaboration with the United Nations on a television series that would report on the efforts of the UN agencies around the world to reduce poverty and human suffering, fight disease, provide humanitarian assistance and stimulate growth.

In February 2017, Icflix signed a deal with IT and entertainment provider PTCL to extend its presence in Pakistan.

The streaming website collaborates with popular companies in the MENA region, offering promotional offers to their customers, among these companies there are: Samsung, Souq.com (E-commerce website), Microsoft, Du (telco), Visa, Ooredoo (telco), Hellofood and LG.

Original productions
In October 2014, icflix began releasing its own original productions, so far two Egyptian movies have been launched: HIV and  Al Makida

HIV is a drama that explores the social repercussions experienced by those infected with HIV through the eyes of a young man, Youssef. Directed by  Mohammad Adel and starring Mohammad Al Sharnouby and Alia Assaf.

Al Makida is a police thriller directed by Ahmed Hassan and starring a team of young actors, including Karim Abdel Khalek, Nour Mahmoud and Moustafa Abdel Salam.

References

Subscription video on demand services